Jan Baeyens (born 16 June 1957) is a Belgian former professional racing cyclist. He rode in the 1985 Tour de France.

References

External links

1957 births
Living people
Belgian male cyclists
People from Ninove
Cyclists from East Flanders